Cholomandinga is a Chilean music band, formed in Concepción in 1996; the band is characterised by its Latin rhythms and ironic lyrics.

History 
The band, originally from Concepción, was formed in 1996 by Karrumba (voice), Mauricio Chazcón Lermanda (guitar), Cristian Flako Lara (bass), Víctor Garrido (drums) and Marcelo Sánchez (percussion). Its name was derived from "cholo", a slang word for a man of African body complexion, and "mandinga" - a countryside nickname of devil. At the beginning they were performing throughout eighth region; later they moved to the capital city Santiago. In 2003 was released their first disc, "Porque Chile es porno", including the hits "El Partío" y "El opio", characterized by simple, entertaining lyrics. Their second release, "En toma", was in 2007.

Members

Current members 
 Carrumba, vocals (1996– •).
 Iván Fredes, guitar (2007– •).
 Miguel González, drums and percussion (2007– •).
 Samy Maluenda, bass (2009– •).
 Alvaro "Tio" Quinchagual, clarinet
 Juan Contreras, trombone

Former members 
 Mauricio Chazcón Lermanda, guitar (2001–2007).
 Cristian Flako Lara, bass and Peruvian cajón (1996–2005).
 Víctor Garrido, drums (1996–2001).
 Marcelo Sánchez, percussion (1996–).
 Sammy Molano, drums and percussion (2001–2005).
 Renzo Valenzuela, congas, timbal and percussion (2002).
 Rodrigo Gómez, trumpet (2002–2004).
 Daniel Danielitro Carmona, trombone (2002–2007).
 Eduardo Oso Jorquera, saxophone and flute (2002–2007).
 Ignacio Pelao Ferrera, trumpet (2004–2007).
 Negro Cristi, bass (2005–2009).
 Pato Pailamilla, trumpet (2007–2009).
 Esteban Núñez, saxophone (2007–2009).
 Negro Medel, bass (2009).
 Nico Errazuriz, keyboard (2009–2010).
 Sebastian Barrera, congas, timbal and percussion (2009–2011).

Discography 

Chilean reggae musical groups
Chilean ska groups